Thüringen, or Thuringia, is a state of Germany.

Thüringen may also refer to:
 Thüringen, Austria, a municipality in the district of Bludenz
 SMS Thüringen, a dreadnought battleship of the Imperial German Navy